In the Hartree–Fock method of quantum mechanics, the Fock matrix is a matrix approximating the single-electron energy operator of a given quantum system in a given set of basis vectors.
It is most often formed in computational chemistry when attempting to solve the Roothaan equations for an atomic or molecular system. The Fock matrix is actually an approximation to the true Hamiltonian operator of the quantum system. It includes the effects of electron-electron repulsion only in an average way. Because the Fock operator is a one-electron operator, it does not include the electron correlation energy.

The Fock matrix is defined by the Fock operator.  In its general form the Fock operator writes:

Where  i runs over the total N spin orbitals. In the closed-shell case, it can be simplified by considering only the spatial orbitals. Noting that the  terms are duplicated and the exchange terms are null between different spins.
For the restricted case which assumes closed-shell orbitals and single-
determinantal wavefunctions, the Fock operator for the i-th electron is given by:

where:

 is the Fock operator for the i-th electron in the system,

 is the one-electron Hamiltonian for the i-th electron,

 is the Coulomb operator, defining the repulsive force between the j-th and i-th electrons in the system,

 is the exchange operator, defining the quantum effect produced by exchanging two electrons.

The Coulomb operator is multiplied by two since there are two electrons in each occupied orbital. The exchange operator is not multiplied by two since it has a non-zero result only for electrons which have the same spin as the i-th electron.

For systems with unpaired electrons there are many choices of Fock matrices.

See also
Hartree–Fock method
Unrestricted Hartree–Fock
Restricted open-shell Hartree–Fock

References

Atomic, molecular, and optical physics
Quantum chemistry
Matrices